The Chestnut Hill Meetinghouse (also known as South Parish Meeting House) is an historic meeting house at the corner of Chestnut and Thayer Streets in Millville, Massachusetts.  The -story wood frame meetinghouse was built in 1769.  It is very plainly decorated, with only its door surrounds of architectural interest.  They consist of pilasters flanking the door, which is topped by a full triangular pediment.  The interior consists of a large meeting chamber, in which stand 26 box pews.  The building served as the meeting place of South Parish into the nineteenth century, and is one of a small number of surviving 18th-century meetinghouses whose main entrance is on the long side of the building.
It is purported to be the first place of worship that the first utterance for the independence of this country was announced 
publicly 

The building was added to the National Register of Historic Places in 1984.

See also
National Register of Historic Places listings in Worcester County, Massachusetts

References

External links

Chestnut Street Meetinghouse

Churches on the National Register of Historic Places in Massachusetts
Buildings and structures in Worcester County, Massachusetts
Churches completed in 1769
Religion in Worcester County, Massachusetts
Millville, Massachusetts
National Register of Historic Places in Worcester County, Massachusetts
1769 establishments in Massachusetts
18th-century churches in the United States